Gaultheria hispidula, commonly known as the creeping snowberry or moxie-plum, and known to Micmaq tribes of Newfoundland as Manna Teaberry, is a perennial spreading ground-level vine of the heath family Ericaceae. It is native to North America and produces small white edible berries. It fruits from August to September. Its leaves and berries taste and smell like wintergreen.

Description

The pale green-white flowers are seen in spring, followed by the white berries in August and September. The fruit is white with small darker-colored hair-like growths. The fruit is edible and has an acidic taste.

Distribution and habitat
Gaultheria hispidula grows in acidic and neutral soils in open woodland and forest verges, particularly on wet ground such as in or on the edge of bogs, often near tree stumps. Its original range spread from far northern Canada to as far south as North Carolina, but it has been extirpated from the southerly portions of its original range.

Ecology
It is pollinated by solitary bees, bumblebees, bee-flies, and hoverflies, while chipmunks and deer mice spread the seed.

Conservation status
Like most plants in North America, deforestation and competition with invasive ornamentals (especially shade-loving groundcovers, such as English ivy or winter creeper commonly sold at garden centers) affect the creeping snowberry significantly. As a result, it has been extirpated from some of its original range and classified as rare in several states. Despite this, its international status has been evaluated as secure. This is because it is still quite common in its more northerly range of greater Canada. However, deforestation and exotic invasion are continuing problems that affect all forest species in both Canada and the United States.

It is listed as endangered in Maryland and New Jersey, as threatened in Rhode Island, as sensitive in Washington, as rare in Pennsylvania, as presumed extirpated in Ohio, and as a species of special concern in Connecticut.

Uses
The Algonquin people use an infusion of the leaves as a tonic for overeating. They also use the fruit as food. The Anticosti use it as a sedative, and the Micmac decoct the leaves or the whole plant for an unspecified purpose. The Ojibwa people use the leaves to make a beverage.

The leaves can be cooked as a vegetable. The fruits can be eaten raw, baked, or used to make jam.

References

hispidula
Flora of New Jersey
Flora of Connecticut
Plants used in Native American cuisine
Plants used in traditional Native American medicine
Flora of the United States
Flora of Canada
Groundcovers